"Circus" is a song co-written and recorded by American singer Lenny Kravitz and released on September 26, 1995, as the second single from his fourth studio album, Circus (1995). There were produced two music videos for the song: one directed by Ruven Afanador and the other by Martyn Atkins. Kravitz explained to Billboard, "it gets more like a circus with all this suff—management people, fans, bankers, investment people. It's like, My God! What happened? It gets harder to be yourself."

Critical reception
Steve Baltin from Cash Box described "Circus" as "a slow blues-based rocker with a killer chorus, a smoking guitar solo near the end and a great fade out. Despite all that, it’s not immediatly obvious what radio formats will embrace this heavy single." Mark Kemp of Rolling Stone stated, "In the title track of Lenny Kravitz's new album, the singer struggles with the dictates of reality that come to bear on fantasy. "Welcome to the real world," he sings to himself. But in the real world according to Kravitz, rock stars still flash diamond rings and coke spoons, and bumper-sticker platitudes like god is love still soften the blows of the real real world."

Track listing

Charts

References

External links
 

Lenny Kravitz songs
1995 songs
Songs written by Lenny Kravitz
Songs written by Gerry DeVeaux
Songs written by Terry Britten